La Récré Des 3 Curés (also known as "La Récré Des Trois Curés") is a 17-hectare (42-acre) amusement park in the commune of Milizac, Finistère, Brittany, France. The park usually sees around 220,000 visitors every year, making it one of the most popular tourist sites in Brittany.

La Récré Des 3 Curés is situated around a lake, and includes multiple rides, playgrounds, slides, games, 3000 m2 of indoor games, and two roller coasters. In addition, the park includes a 4-star campground.

History
The park's name is derived from that of a local legend, "Lieu-dit des Trois Curés", which tells the story of the park's locations between three communes; Milizac, Bourg-Blanc, and Coat-Méal. The legend says that the resident Priest of each jurisdiction wanted to meet at an inn, but couldn't, as they were unable to leave their parish's territory. To overcome the said obstacle, a triangular table was built at the crossroads between the three municipalities, and each could sit on one side of the table while in the company of the others. During their meetings, they could be served by the local inn.

In the late 1980s, park co-founder Jean-Pierre Bonnefoy worked as a nighttime taxi driver, and had grown tired of the job. In 1989, Jean-Pierre and his brother Francis established a small campground, which at the time had only 25 pitches. At first, business was slow. However, in order to attract and keep potential customers, the brothers began to install various games and playground utilities. As attendance increased and the park began to gain a solid reputation among park-goers, a go-kart track was installed, and 2001 saw the addition of the park's first major roller coaster; the Grand Huit. The roller coaster was attributed to be the cause towards a 20% increase in park attendance, from 80,000 to 100,000 visitors.

La Récré Des 3 Curés continued to invest in new attractions while maintaining the park and campground. In 2011, the children of the Bonnefoy brothers began to share park management and director duties. The park began to create and run live shows starting in 2017. For the 2019 season, La Récré invested €2.5 million into a brand new reception building, which would contain park offices and ticket sales. The work was carried out by 24 different firms, 22 of whom were from the Finistère region.
For the park's 30th anniversary in 2020, Vertika, a major looping coaster from German manufacturer Gerstlauer, opened to the public. The coaster represented an €5 million investment; an amount previously unheard of for La Récré.

Attractions

Roller coasters

Water rides

Rides

Other attractions
Bassin Pour Enfants; A circular children's wading pool.
Cannonade; An indoor playground attraction where children can use air cannons to shoot foam balls at one another.
Ciné 6D; A Motion simulator/theatre attraction showcasing two short movies.
Jeux Couverts; A variety of indoor playgrounds.
Labyrinthe; A multi-level playground.
Pédalo; Pedalos that can be used on the lake.
Royaume de Margaux; A colorful outdoor toddler's playground that was installed for the 2014 season.
Volcan; A cone-shaped slanted climbing structure with a slide at the top.

Former attractions
Super Dragoon; Levent Lunapark wacky worm children's coaster (2014-2015).

References

External links
Official website

Amusement parks in France
1989 establishments in France
Amusement parks opened in 1989